Robert Mutzers (born 6 April 1993) is a Dutch football player who plays for GVV Unitas.

Club career
He made his Eerste Divisie debut for FC Dordrecht on 18 August 2017 in a game against Fortuna Sittard.

On 14 March 2021, he agreed to join GVV Unitas.

References

External links
 Robert Mutzers Interview
 

1993 births
People from Oosterhout
Living people
Dutch footballers
Association football forwards
De Treffers players
FC Dordrecht players
FC Chornomorets Odesa players
Kozakken Boys players
Helmond Sport players
Eerste Divisie players
Tweede Divisie players
Derde Divisie players
Ukrainian Premier League players
Dutch expatriate footballers
Expatriate footballers in Ukraine
Dutch expatriate sportspeople in Ukraine
Expatriate footballers in Belgium
Dutch expatriate sportspeople in Belgium
VV Dongen players
Footballers from North Brabant